Kupunkamint Mountain is located in the Lewis Range, Glacier National Park in the U.S. state of Montana. Kupunkamint Mountain is in the southeastern section of Glacier National Park. The mountain's name was officially adopted in 1940 by the United States Board on Geographic Names to commemorate a Kootenai Indian.

See also
 Mountains and mountain ranges of Glacier National Park (U.S.)

References

Kupunkamint Mountain
Mountains of Glacier National Park (U.S.)
Lewis Range
Mountains of Montana